This is a list of television broadcasters from around the world which provide coverage of the Serie A, Italian football's top-level club competition.

2011–2015

2015–2018

2018–2021

2021–2024

Overseas broadcasters

2021–2024

Africa

America

Asia and Oceania

Europe

MENA

References 

Association football on television
Serie A
brod
Serie A